Weston is an unincorporated town, a post office, and a census-designated place (CDP) located in and governed by Las Animas County, Colorado, United States. The Weston post office has the ZIP Code 81091. At the United States Census 2010, the population of the Weston CDP was 55, while the population of the 81091 ZIP Code Tabulation Area was 812 including adjacent areas.

History
The Weston Post Office has been in operation since 1889. The community was named after A. J. Weston, a local pioneer.

There is an old church at Vigil Plaza, near Weston.

There is a different old church dating from 1866 or 1867, and a cemetery, about three miles east, at Medina Plaza.  These were listed on the National Register of Historic Places in 2019 as Our Lady of Guadalupe Church and Medina Cemetery.

Geography
Weston sits in the valley of the Purgatoire River, on the north side of the river, near where the South Fork joins the main stem. Colorado State Highway 12 passes through the community, leading east (downriver)  to Trinidad, the county seat, and west  to Stonewall Gap.

Demographics

See also

Outline of Colorado
Index of Colorado-related articles
State of Colorado
Colorado cities and towns
Colorado census designated places
Colorado counties
Las Animas County, Colorado

References

External links

Weston @ Colorado.com
Weston @ UncoverColorado.com
Weston @ SouthernColorado.info
Las Animas County website

Census-designated places in Las Animas County, Colorado
Census-designated places in Colorado